The Izmail Regional Committee of the Communist Party of Ukraine, commonly referred to as the Izmail CPU obkom, was the position of highest authority in the Izmail Oblast, in the Ukrainian SSR of the Soviet Union. The position was created in July 1940 following the 1940 Soviet occupation of Bessarabia and Northern Bukovina during the ongoing World War II and abolished in 1954 when it was merged with the Odessa Regional Committee.

The First Secretary was a de facto appointed position usually by the Central Committee of the Communist Party of Ukraine or the First Secretary of the Republic.

List of First Secretaries of the Communist Party of Izmail Oblast

See also
Izmail Oblast

Notes

Sources
 World Statesmen.org

Regional Committees of the Communist Party of Ukraine (Soviet Union)
Ukrainian Soviet Socialist Republic
History of Odesa Oblast
History of Budjak
1940 establishments in the Soviet Union
1954 disestablishments in the Soviet Union